The Poulenc Trio is an American chamber music ensemble and oboe-bassoon-piano trio, formed in 2003. The current members are pianist Irina Kaplan Lande, bassoonist Bryan Young and oboist Alexander Vvedenskiy. Former members have included New York Philharmonic principal oboist Liang Wang, Orpheus Chamber Orchestra oboist James Austin Smith and Vladimir Lande. Wang joined the group in 2015 after the departure of the founding oboist Vladimir Lande.

Collaborations 
The Poulenc Trio has performed with notable collaborators including Grammy-winners Hilary Hahn and David Shifrin, Avery Fisher Grant-recipients Anthony McGill and Alexander Fiterstein, and has recorded with the poet and Guggenheim Fellow, Lia Purpura.

Recordings 
The Trio's performances have been broadcast on American public radio programs including NPR's Performance Today and PRX's Wolf Trap Live from Center Stage. The Trio has released recordings on the Marquis Classics and Delos/Naxos labels.

Repertoire 
The group is named after the composer Francis Poulenc, whose 1926 Trio for oboe, bassoon, and piano is among the most popular works for the combination of instruments. Other notable examples of works written for the combo include trios by André Previn and Jean Françaix. The Poulenc Trio has also commissioned and performed arrangements of works by Beethoven, Stravinsky, Mikhail Glinka, Rossini, Duke Ellington, Astor Piazzolla, Paquito D'Rivera, Charlie Chaplin and others.

Commissions 
The Poulenc Trio regularly commissions works by living composers. The group has premiered 25 new works since its founding, including:

References

External links 
Poulenc Trio website

Classical music trios
American classical music groups
Musical groups from New York City
Musical groups from Baltimore
Musical groups established in 2003
Organizations established in 2003